Duc or DUC may refer to:

People
 The etymology and French term for a Duke
 Dục Đức (1852–1883), emperor of Vietnam
 Tự Đức (1829–1883), emperor of Vietnam
 Thích Quảng Đức (1897–1963), Buddhist monk
 Hélène Duc (1917–2014), French actress
 Catherine Duc, Vietnamese-Australian musician

Places
 Thủ Đức, a district of Ho Chi Minh City
 Đức Phổ, a district-level town, Quảng Ngãi Province, Vietnam
 Mộ Đức, a township and capital of Mộ Đức District, Quảng Ngãi Province, Vietnam
 Yên Đức, a rural commune and village of Đông Triều town, Quảng Ninh Province, Vietnam
 Mỹ Đức (disambiguation), several places in Vietnam

Abbreviations
 Dakar UC, a Senegalese football club
 DUC (oil well), drilled but uncompleted wells 
 Digital up converter, increases the sample rate of signals
 Halliburton Field (airport), IATA / FAA airport codes
 Distinguished Unit Citation, the original name of the U.S. Presidential Unit Citation
 Democratic Union for Change, a Kenyan political party
 D.U.C, a 2015 album by Booba

Other uses
 Duc Duc massacre, 1971
 Battle of Duc Duc, 1974
 Bánh đúc, a Vietnamese cake

See also
 DUCS (disambiguation)